Killing Time is a dystopian novel by Caleb Carr set in the Mid-21st Century. It was initially serialized in TIME and later published in 2000 by Random House. It includes criticisms of the information age (see quotes below). The book was a departure for Carr, whose previous two novels (and his subsequent one) were crime thrillers set in the Victorian era.

Characters

Main Characters
Dr. Gideon Wolfe: the criminal and psychiatrist.
Dov Eshkol: the antagonist, a ruthless, fanatic agent of the Israeli Mossad

Other Team-Members 
Prof. Julien Fouché: the molecular biologist
Dr. Eli Kuperman: the anthropologist
Dr. Jonah Kuperman: the archaeologist
Colonel Slayton: the (ex-US-)soldier
Dr. Leon Tarbell: the documents expert
Larissa Tressalian: Gideon's lover/ former assassin
Malcom Tressalian: leader of the team/ Larissa's brother

Minor Characters
Chief Dugumbe: leader of the African tribe, with which Dr. Gideon Wolfe lives upon writing down his story
Mutesa: member of the African tribe, who becomes Dr. Wolfe's host and sponsor
General Said: Malaysian warlord and arms dealer

Quotes
 "Mundus vult decipi" is a Latin phrase meaning "The world wants to be deceived"
 "It is the greatest truth of our age: Information is not knowledge."
 I have but one lamp by which my feet are guided, and that is the lamp of experience. I know no way of judging the future but by the past. -- Patrick Henry, 1775

2000 American novels
Dystopian novels
Techno-thriller novels
Novels first published in serial form
Novels by Caleb Carr
Works originally published in Time (magazine)